North East Somerset is a constituency represented in the House of Commons of the UK Parliament, since it was created for the 2010 general election, by Jacob Rees-Mogg of the Conservative Party.

Boundaries 
The constituency covers the part of Bath and North East Somerset District that is not in the Bath constituency and as such contains 18 electoral wards wholly in the constituency and two parishes in Newbridge ward of the Bath and North East Somerset:

Bathavon North – the Civil Parishes ('Parishes') of Batheaston, Bathford, Bathampton, Charlcombe,   St Catherine and Swainswick
Bathavon South – the Parishes of Camerton, Claverton, Combe Hay, Dunkerton, Englishcombe, Freshford, Hinton Charterhouse, Marksbury, Monkton Combe, Priston, Shoscombe, South Stoke and Wellow
Chew Valley – the Parishes of Chew Magna, Chew Stoke, Compton Martin, Nempnett Thrubwell, Norton Malreward, Stanton Drew, Stowey-Sutton and Ubley
Clutton and Farmborough – the Parishes of Chelwood, Clutton and Farmborough
High Littleton – the Parishes of Farrington Gurney and High Littleton
Keynsham North
Keynsham South
Keynsham East
Mendip – the Parishes of Cameley, East Harptree, Hinton Blewett and West Harptree
Midsomer Norton North
Midsomer Norton Redfield
Newbridge – the Parishes of Kelston and North Stoke
Paulton – the Parish of Paulton
Peasedown – the Parish of Peasedown St John
Publow and Whitchurch – the Parishes of Publow and Whitchurch
Radstock
Saltford – the Parishes of Compton Dando, Corston, Newton St Loe and Saltford
Timsbury – the Parish of Timsbury
Westfield

Origin of first boundaries
Parliament accepted the Boundary Commission's Fifth Periodic Review of Westminster constituencies which transferred all the electoral wards in Wandsyke constituency save for its four wards in South Gloucestershire to this new seat. To compensate the new seat gained the whole of the large wards in the valley of the City, Bathavon North, and the rest of Bathavon South, both from the Bath constituency.

Constituency profile

This area is marked by significant agriculture and green belts around almost each of its settlements, which largely consist of detached and semi-detached properties, with a low rate of unemployment and negligible social housing tenancy.

An unusually shaped seat that takes in all the western part of the Bath and North East Somerset council area, and the rural outskirts of Bath in the east, meaning the Bath constituency is entirely surrounded by a thin belt of North East Somerset. The seat contains some contrasting areas. The northern parts of the seat, especially the town of Keynsham, are commuter areas for Bath and Bristol. To the west the seat is more rural, covering the patchwork of farmland and rural villages that make up the Chew Valley. The southern part around Midsomer Norton and Radstock is part of the old Somerset Coalfield. The last of the coal mines closed in the 1970s, to be replaced by light industry, but the close knit industrial heritage of the area remains.

North East Somerset is estimated to have voted to Leave the European Union by 51.6% in the 2016 referendum on the UK's membership of the EU.

Members of Parliament

Elections

Elections in the 2020s

Elections in the 2010s

* Served in the 2005–2010 Parliament as MP for Wansdyke

The changes in vote share are compared to a notional calculation of the 2005 result. Although the Wansdkye seat had been held by Labour for 13 years, this seat was already notionally a Conservative seat by a margin of 0.4%. This means that, if the seat in current boundaries had been contested in 2005, the Conservatives would have won by a few hundred votes.

See also 
 List of parliamentary constituencies in Avon
 Wansdyke (abolished) – the predecessor constituency.

Notes

References

Sources
 UKPolling Report – Anthony Wells calculations of notional majorities.

Parliamentary constituencies in Somerset
Politics of Bath and North East Somerset
Constituencies of the Parliament of the United Kingdom established in 2010